Khudadat bey Rafibeyli (1878 – 1920), also known as Khudadat Rafibeyov, was a Russian Empire statesman who served as Governor General of Ganja Governorate and Minister of Healthcare of Azerbaijan Democratic Republic, and was also the member of Azerbaijani National Council and later Parliament of Azerbaijan. He was the father of  Azerbaijani writer Nigar Rafibeyli, father-in-law of Rasul Rza and grandfather of Anar Rzayev, chairman of Writers' Union of Azerbaijan.

Early years
Rafibeyli was born in Elisabethpol, Elisabethpol Governorate in the Russian Empire. Having completed a gymnasium in Ganja, he left for Kharkiv to study medicine at Kharkiv State University. Graduating in 1903, he returned to Ganja and began his medical practice. He is recognized as one of the first degreed professional surgeons of Azerbaijan. In 1914, he established the first Medical Society of Azerbaijan in Elisabethpol, providing the population with free medical care. After the 1917 revolution in Russia, Rafibeyli was elected a member of the Interim Executive Committee of the National Muslim Council and then member of Azerbaijani National Council.

Political career
With establishment of the Azerbaijan Democratic Republic on May 28, 1918 Rafibeyli was given several posts within the government. On June 17, 1918 when the second cabinet of ADR convened, he was appointed to lead the new Ministry of Healthcare. While in office, he established several hospitals and medical laboratories throughout the country and opened the office of Red Crescent in Azerbaijan. For his contributions to healthcare within Russian Empire, Rafibeyli was awarded Order of Saint Stanislaus of the Third Degree. In May, 1919 Rafibeyli was appointed the Governor General of Ganja Governorate.

After takeover of Azerbaijan by Bolsheviks on April 28, 1920 Rafibeyli was executed by the Bolshevik firing squad without a trial on Nargin island just a few kilometers away from Baku.

See also

Azerbaijani National Council
Cabinets of Azerbaijan Democratic Republic (1918-1920)
Current Cabinet of Azerbaijan Republic

References

1878 births
1920 deaths
Azerbaijan Democratic Republic politicians
Government ministers of Azerbaijan
Soviet rehabilitations
Politicians from Ganja, Azerbaijan
People from Elizavetpol Governorate
Recipients of the Order of Saint Stanislaus (Russian), 3rd class
Executed Azerbaijani people
National University of Kharkiv alumni
Surgeons from the Russian Empire
People from the Russian Empire
Participants of the Ganja revolt